Statistics of International Soccer League in season 1960.

League standings

Championship final

Notes

References
International Soccer League II (RSSSF)

International Soccer League seasons
International Soccer League, 1960